Eduardo José Diniz Costa (born 18 April 1989 in Guaraí, Tocantins), simply known as Eduardo, is a Brazilian footballer who plays for Linense on loan from São Bernardo as a full back.

Honours
São Bernardo
Campeonato Paulista Série A2: 2021

Portuguesa
Campeonato Paulista Série A2: 2022

References

External links

1989 births
Living people
Sportspeople from Tocantins
Brazilian footballers
Association football defenders
Campeonato Brasileiro Série A players
Campeonato Brasileiro Série B players
Sociedade Esportiva Palmeiras players
Esporte Clube Vitória players
Mirassol Futebol Clube players
Comercial Futebol Clube (Ribeirão Preto) players
São Bernardo Futebol Clube players
Associação Portuguesa de Desportos players
América Futebol Clube (MG) players
Ceará Sporting Club players
Atlético Clube Goianiense players
Clube de Regatas Brasil players
Clube Atlético Linense players
Joinville Esporte Clube players
Sociedade Esportiva e Recreativa Caxias do Sul players
J1 League players
Gamba Osaka players
Brazilian expatriate footballers
Brazilian expatriate sportspeople in Japan
Expatriate footballers in Japan